Tahoe Donner is a large home owners association located in the Sierra Nevada, off of Highway I-80, in Truckee, California, which offers a ski resort, golf course, and other amenities. Tahoe Donner is one of America's largest homeowner's associations, with 6,473 properties, more than 23,000 members, and more than 7,000 acres in the Sierra Nevada mountains. In 2017, USA Today voting panelists ranked Tahoe Donner "Number two for Best Cross Country Ski Resort in the U.S. and Canada."

In addition to the ski resort, Tahoe Donner amenities (some semi-private) include a private beach club and marina on Donner Lake, the Alder Creek Adventure Center (which includes a ski center, cafe, bar, bike shop, an equestrian center with horseback riding trails), a golf course, walking trails in the Euer Valley, the Trout Creek Recreation Center, and the Club House.

In the winter, Tahoe Donner offers alpine and cross-country skiing, snow play. The ski area usually opens 24–36 hours after receiving two to three feet of snow. The downhill ski area includes two chairlifts, three surface lifts, and more than a dozen trails. During the summer, the association offers activities such as golf, swimming, tennis, and hiking.

History
Back in the 1960´s Jack Kirby purchased 4,020 acres from a Christmas tree farmer in Truckee, California, in the heart of the Sierra Nevada mountain range. In 1971 He opened the Tahoe Donner Resort to the public.

References

External links
 Official website

Truckee, California
Tourist attractions in Nevada County, California